Pterin is a heterocyclic compound composed of a pteridine ring system, with a "keto group" (a lactam) and an amino group on positions 4 and 2 respectively.  It is structurally related to the parent bicyclic heterocycle called pteridine. Pterins, as a group, are compounds related to pterin with additional substituents.  Pterin itself is of no biological significance. 

Pterins were first discovered in the pigments of butterfly wings (hence the origin of their name, from the  Greek pteron (πτερόν), wing) and perform many roles in coloration in the biological world.

Chemistry 
Pterins exhibit a wide range of tautomerism in water, beyond what is assumed by just keto-enol tautomerism. For the unsubstituted pterin, at least five tautomers are commonly cited. For 6-methylpterin, seven tautomers are theoretically predicted to be important in solution.

The pteridine ring system contains four nitrogen atoms, reducing its aromaticity to the point that it can be attacked by nucleophile. Pterins can take three oxidation states on the ring system: the unprefixed oxidized form, the 7,8-dihydro semi-reduced form (among other, less stable tautomers), and finally the 5,6,7,8-tetrahydro fully-reduced form. The latter two are more common in biological systems.

Biosynthesis 
Pterin rings are either salvaged from existing ones or produced de novo in living organisms. The ring comes from rearrangement of guanosine in bacteria and humans.

Pterin cofactors
Pterin derivatives are common cofactors in all domains of life.

Folates 
One important family of pterin derivatives are folates. Folates are pterins that contain p-aminobenzoic acid connected to the methyl group at position 6 of the pteridine ring system (known as pteroic acid) conjugated with one or more L-glutamates.  They participate in numerous biological group transfer reactions.  Folate-dependent biosynthetic reactions include the transfer of methyl groups from 5-methyltetrahydrofolate to homocysteine to form L-methionine, and the transfer of formyl groups from 10-formyltetrahydrofolate to L-methionine to form N-formylmethionine in initiator tRNAs.  Folates are also essential for the biosynthesis of purines and one pyrimidine.

Substituted pteridines are intermediates in the biosynthesis of dihydrofolic acid in many microorganisms. The enzyme dihydropteroate synthetase converts pteridine and 4-aminobenzoic acid to dihydrofolic acid in the presence of glutamate. The enzyme dihydropteroate synthetase is inhibited by sulfonamide antibiotics.

Molybdopterin 

Molybdopterin is a cofactor found in virtually all molybdenum and tungsten-containing proteins. It binds molybdenum to yield redox cofactors involved in biological hydroxylations, reduction of nitrate, and respiratory oxidation.

Molybdopterin biosynthesis does not use the conventional GTPCH-1 pathway. It occurs in four steps:
 the radical-mediated cyclization of nucleotide, guanosine 5'-triphosphate (GTP), to (8S)‑3 ́,8‐cyclo‑7,8‑dihydroguanosine 5 ́‑triphosphate (3 ́,8‑cH2GTP), 
 the formation of cyclic pyranopterin monophosphate (cPMP) from the 3 ́,8‑cH2GTP, 
 the conversion of cPMP into molybdopterin (MPT),
 the insertion of molybdate into MPT to form Moco (molybdenum cofactor).

Tetrahydrobiopterin
Tetrahydrobiopterin, the major unconjugated pterin in vertebrates, is involved in three families of enzymes that effect hydroxylation. The aromatic amino acid hydroxylases include phenylalanine hydroxylase, tyrosine hydroxylase, and tryptophan hydroxylases. They are involved in the synthesis of neurotransmitters catecholamine and serotonin. Tetrahydrobiopterin is also required for the functioning of alkylglycerol monooxygenase, whereby monoalkylglycerols are broken down to glycerol and an aldehyde.  In the synthesis of nitric oxide the pterin-dependent nitric oxide synthase converts arginine to N-hydroxy derivative, which in turn releases NO.

Other pterins

Tetrahydromethanopterin is a cofactor in methanogenesis, which is a metabolism adopted by many organisms, as a form of anaerobic respiration.  It carries the C1 substrate in the course of the formation or production of methane. It is structurally similar to folate.

Pterin pigments

Cyanopterin is a glycosylated version of pteridine of unknown function in cyanobacteria.

See also 

Folic acid
Molybdopterin
Pteridine
Tetrahydrobiopterin
Tetrahydromethanopterin

References

External links 
 

Cofactors
Pteridines
Enones